Sandrine Berges (born 1970) is a French philosopher and Professor of Philosophy at Bilkent University. She is known for her works on feminist philosophy, ethics and political philosophy.

Books
 Plato on Virtue and the Law, Continuum, 2012
 The Routledge Guidebook to Wollstonecraft’s A Vindication of the Rights of Woman, Routledge, 2013
 A Feminist Perspective on Virtue Ethics, Palgrave Macmillan, 2015
 The Social and Political Philosophy of Mary Wollstonecraft, edited by Sandrine Bergès and Alan Coffee, Oxford University Press, 2017
 Women Philosophers on Autonomy: Historical and Contemporary Perspectives, edited by Sandrine Berges and Alberto L. Siani, Routledge, 2018
 The Wollstonecraftian Mind, edited by Sandrine Bergès, Eileen Hunt Botting and Alan Coffee, Routledge, 2019
 Sophie de Grouchy's Letters on Sympathy: A Critical Engagement with Adam Smith's The Theory of Moral Sentiments, Translated by Sandrine Berges, Oxford University Press, 2019

References

External links
Sandrine Berges at Bilkent University

21st-century French philosophers
Philosophy academics
Living people
1970 births
Political philosophers
Academic staff of Bilkent University
Alumni of King's College London
Alumni of the University of Leeds
Alumni of Birkbeck, University of London
Social philosophers
French–English translators
French women philosophers